Frederik Storm (born 20 February 1989) is a Danish professional ice hockey player currently playing for ERC Ingolstadt of the Deutsche Eishockey Liga (DEL). He participated at the 2011 IIHF World Championship as a member of the Denmark men's national ice hockey team.

On 2 November 2016, Storm agreed to a three-year contract extension to remain with the Malmö Redhawks of the SHL.

Career statistics

Regular season and playoffs

International

References

External links
 

1989 births
Living people
Danish ice hockey forwards
ERC Ingolstadt players
Herlev Hornets players
Malmö Redhawks players
SønderjyskE Ishockey players
People from Gentofte Municipality
Ice hockey players at the 2022 Winter Olympics
Olympic ice hockey players of Denmark
Sportspeople from the Capital Region of Denmark